Béatrice Arnac (23 April 1931 – 5 October 2020) was a French actress, singer, and composer.

Biography
The daughter of the cartoonist Marcel Arnac, Béatrice was also the niece of explorer Marie Gallaud.

In 1962, she received the Grand Prize of the Académie Charles Cros. She performed 22 songs that were written by songwriters such as Paul Éluard, Paul Verlaine, Arthur Rimbaud, Robert Desnos, and Bertolt Brecht. She also performed in the second act of the play Le Bel indifférent. She performed at the Théâtre des Champs-Élysées and on the television show La Chance aux chansons. She was part of the cast of La Traversée de Paris, released in 1956.

Béatrice Arnac died in Castels et Bézenac on 5 October 2020.

Filmography

Cinema
La Fille de Mata Hari/Mata Hari's Daughter/La figlia di Mata Hari (1955)
Frou-Frou (1955)
Lola Montès (1955)
Milord l'Arsouille (1955)
La vie est belle (1956)
La Traversée de Paris (1956)
Les Truands (1956)
OSS 117 n'est pas mort/OSS 117 Is Not Dead (1957)
Le Souffle du désir (1958)
La Nuit des suspectes (1960)
Le Soupirant/The Suitor (1962)
La Journée de Pernette (1963) (short)
Dernier Domicile connu/Last Known Address (1970)
Midi Minuit (1970)
Les Petites Filles modèles/Good Little Girls (1971)
Hunter Nights (2018)

Television
Isabelle (1970)

Soundtracks
Le Soupirant/The Suitor (1962), performer "O toi l'amour"DiscographyChante Alain Saury (1963)La rue Saint-Jean (1964)L'amour (1964)Beatrice Arnac (1966)Les Temps Des Amazones (1968)Beatrice Arnac (1973)Animale (1979)En Liberté En Public Au Fanal (1979)Béatrice Arnac chante Zo d'Axa (2001)
TheatreScabreuse Aventure at the Théâtre du Vieux-Colombier (1957)Nouvelle Orléans at the Théâtre de l'Étoile (1958)Rosa la Rose at the Théâtre des Capucines (1960)Caviar ou lentilles'' at the Théâtre Michel (1965)

References

External links
 

1931 births
2020 deaths
20th-century French actresses
20th-century French women singers
21st-century French women singers
Artists from Waterbury, Connecticut